Ali Mohammad Haghshenas (May 4, 1940 – April 30, 2010) was an Iranian linguist and emeritus professor of linguistics at the University of Tehran. He was a winner of Iran's Book of the Year Award.

Books
 Phonetics, Tehran: Agah
 Farhang e Hezareh, Tehran: Farhang-e Moaser

References

1940 births
2010 deaths
Linguists from Iran
Iranian lexicographers
People from Jahrom
Phoneticians
English–Persian translators
Alumni of SOAS University of London
Academic staff of the University of Tehran
Iranian Science and Culture Hall of Fame recipients in Literature and Culture
20th-century translators